Robert Pignard (born 1902, date of death unknown) was a French sports shooter. He competed in the trap event at the 1956 Summer Olympics.

References

1902 births
Year of death missing
French male sport shooters
Olympic shooters of France
Shooters at the 1956 Summer Olympics
Place of birth missing